Pristane is a natural saturated terpenoid alkane obtained primarily from shark liver oil, from which its name is derived (Latin pristis, "shark"). It is also found in the stomach oil of birds in the order Procellariiformes and in mineral oil and some foods. Pristane and phytane are used in the fields of geology and environmental science as biomarkers to characterize origins and evolution of petroleum hydrocarbons and coal.

It is a transparent oily liquid that is immiscible with water, but soluble in diethyl ether, benzene, chloroform and carbon tetrachloride.

Pristane is known to induce autoimmune diseases in rodents. It is used in research to understand the pathogenesis of rheumatoid arthritis and lupus.

It is used as a lubricant, a transformer oil, an immunologic adjuvant, and an anti-corrosion agent, biological marker, plasmocytomas inducer and in production of monoclonal antibodies.

Biosynthetically, pristane is derived from phytol and is used as a biomarker in petroleum studies. Tocopherols represent an alternate sedimentary source of pristane in sediments and petroleum.

Toxicity of pristane is alleviated by aconitine.

References 

Alkanes
Diterpenes